Francisco Javier Campos Coll (born 10 March 1982), known as Xisco Campos, is a Spanish professional footballer who plays as a central defender or a right-back.

He spent most of his career with Gimnàstic, appearing in more than 200 competitive matches over six seasons, three spent in Segunda División. He played 11 La Liga games with Mallorca, in two separate spells.

Club career
Born in Binissalem, Balearic Islands and a product of local RCD Mallorca's youth academy, Campos appeared twice for the first team in late 2004/early 2005, both as a substitute and at home, against Atlético Madrid (1–1) and Deportivo de La Coruña (2–2). He subsequently represented Levante UD B, Écija Balompié, Real Murcia and CD Castellón, the latter two clubs in Segunda División.

In the summer of 2010, Campos signed with Gimnàstic de Tarragona also of the second tier. After being relegated at the end of the 2011–12 season he renewed his contract with the Catalans for another year, and was also appointed team captain.

Campos made his 100th league appearance for Nàstic on 8 September 2013, in a 1–0 home win over RCD Espanyol B. On 11 July 2016, after falling down the pecking order, the 34-year-old moved to SD Ponferradina.

On 29 June 2017, Campos became a free agent and returned to Mallorca after 12 years away. He was part of their teams that earned two consecutive promotions to reach La Liga at the end of the 2018–19 campaign.

Xisco played 11 matches in 2019–20 – nine in the league, two in the Copa del Rey – in an immediate relegation. He was subsequently released, and joined Segunda División B side Pontevedra CF.

References

External links

1982 births
Living people
Spanish footballers
Footballers from Mallorca
Association football defenders
La Liga players
Segunda División players
Segunda División B players
Primera Federación players
RCD Mallorca B players
RCD Mallorca players
Atlético Levante UD players
Écija Balompié players
Real Murcia players
CD Castellón footballers
Gimnàstic de Tarragona footballers
SD Ponferradina players
Pontevedra CF footballers
Zamora CF footballers